Welter may refer to 

Welter (magazine), a literary magazine based at the University of Baltimore, United States
Welter (surname)
Welter Racing, French sports car maker
Welterweight, a weight class division in combat sports, especially boxing